Dănești is a commune in Gorj County, Oltenia, Romania. It is composed of eleven villages: Barza, Botorogi, Brătuia, Bucureasa, Dănești, Merfulești, Șasa, Trocani, Țârculești, Ungureni and Văcarea.

Natives
 Emil Ciocoiu

References

Communes in Gorj County
Localities in Oltenia